The 1979 Italian Indoor Open, also known as the Bologna Open or Bologna Indoor, was a men's tennis tournament played on indoor carpet courts that was part of the 1979 Colgate-Palmolive Grand Prix circuit and took place in Bologna, Italy. It was the fifth edition of the tournament and was held from 19 November through 25 November 1979. Fourth-seeded Butch Walts won the singles title.

Finals

Singles
 Butch Walts defeated  Gianni Ocleppo 6–3, 6–2
 It was Walts' 2nd and last singles title of the year and the 4th and last of his career.

Doubles
 Peter Fleming /  John McEnroe defeated  Fritz Buehning /  Ferdi Taygan 6–1, 6–1

References

External links
 ATP tournament profile
 ITF tournament edition details

Italian Indoor Open
Italian Indoor Open
Italian Indoor Open
November 1979 sports events in Europe